Weizi may refer to:

People
Weizi of Song ( 11th century BC), proper name Zi Qi, also known as Weizi, brother of King Zhou of Shang and the first ruler of Zhou's state Song
Wei Zi (born 1956), Chinese actor

Places in China
Weizi, Shanxi (微子), a town in Changzhi, Shanxi
Weizi, Sichuan (卫子), a town in Guangyuan, Sichuan
Weizi Subdistrict (围子街道), a subdistrict in Changyi, Shandong